Denis Giraudet (born 16 December 1955) is a French rally co-driver.

Rally career
Giraudet started his career in 1981. He won his first rally at 1993 Rally Finland alongside four-time world champion Juha Kankkunen. His most successful partnership was with the 1994 world champion Didier Auriol. His last appearance in the World Rally Championship was at 2019 Monte Carlo Rally, where he was the navigator of Rhys Yates in a Škoda Fabia R5.

Victories

WRC victories

References

External links

 Denis Giraudet's e-wrc profile

1955 births
Living people
French rally co-drivers
World Rally Championship co-drivers